Eleşkirt is a town of Ağrı Province in Turkey. It is the seat of Eleşkirt District. Its population is 10,191 (2021). Its name is a transference from Alashkert, the valley's former administrative centre but now a village known as Toprakkale. It was known as Vagharshakert in medieval sources. At the time of the Russo-Turkish War of 1877–1878 approximately half of the population consisted of Armenians and the rest of Kurds and Turks.

The mayor is Ramazan Yakut (Felicity Party).

Notable people
Şakiro

References

Populated places in Ağrı Province
Ski areas and resorts in Turkey
Kurdish settlements in Turkey